The Attucks Theatre, located in Norfolk, Virginia, United States, was financed, designed and constructed by African American entrepreneurs in 1919. The theatre was designed by Harvey Johnson, an African-American architect. The theatre was named in honor of Crispus Attucks, an African American who was the first patriot to lose his life in the Revolutionary War.  When it was first opened, Attucks Theatre was known as the "Apollo Theatre of the South." It has hosted performers ranging from Cab Calloway to Redd Foxx. The theater hosted numerous famous entertainers through the 1920s, 1930s, 1940s and early 1950s, including Norfolk's Gary U.S. Bonds and Portsmouth's Ruth Brown.

The theater was added to the National Register of Historic Places on September 16, 1982. After a three-year restoration, the theatre reopened in 2004 as a partnership between the City of Norfolk's Department of Cultural Facilities and the Crispus Attucks Cultural Center.

The theatre is located at the intersection of Church Street and Virginia Beach Boulevard, near Norfolk's entertainment and cultural attractions, including Harbor Park, Harrison Opera House, Norfolk Scope, Wells Theatre and Waterside.

Today, the Norfolk theatre is formally known as The Crispus Attucks Cultural Center. After extensive renovations, the theatre re-opened in October 2004.  The theatre is currently owned and operated by SevenVenues, a department of the City of Norfolk.

References

External links
 Official site
 City of Norfolk's Seven Venues Official site

African-American history of Virginia
National Register of Historic Places in Norfolk, Virginia
Theatres completed in 1919
Theatres in Virginia
Culture of Norfolk, Virginia
Buildings and structures in Norfolk, Virginia
Tourist attractions in Norfolk, Virginia
Theatres on the National Register of Historic Places in Virginia
1919 establishments in Virginia